María Isabel Celaá Diéguez (born 23 May 1949) is a Spanish politician. In June 2018, she was appointed Minister of Education and Vocational Training and Spokesperson of the Government of Spain. Since 2022, she serves as Ambassador to the Holy See.

Biography

Politics in the Basque Country 
She started in politics in 1987 as head of the cabinet of the Regional minister of Education, Universities and Research José Ramón Recalde. After the brief interregnum of the coalition government PNV-EA-EE of 1991, she was vice-minister of Education, Universities and Research with Fernando Buesa as Basque counselor until the end of the legislature (1995). In the following legislature she abandoned the educational responsibilities, being director of the cabinet of the Counselor of Justice, Economy, Labor and Social Security, Ramón Jáuregui. Between 1998 and 2009 and 2012 and 2016, she has been a member of the Basque Parliament for Province of Vizcaya. As a parliamentarian, she was responsible for the educational issues of her group. Between 2008 and 2009 she was the first vice president of the Basque Parliament. From 2009 to 2012 she held the position of Counselor of Education, Universities and Research in the government of Patxi López, She is particularly interested in the improvement of the Basque educational system and technology, and advocates scientific research.

She was head of list of the PSE-EE to the Senate by the circumscription of Vizcaya in the general elections of 2015 and 2016 but she was not elected.

She is a member of the executive committee of the Socialist Party of the Basque Country–Basque Country Left (PSOE) party.

Minister of Education and Vocational Training 
On 7 June 2018, Pedro Sánchez after being sworn new Spanish Prime Minister, following the motion of censure that the PSOE presented against the previous government of Mariano Rajoy (PP) and that was approved by the Congress of Deputies on 1 June 2018, appointed her as Minister in new Spanish government. Felipe VI sanctioned by royal decree of June her appointment as holder of the portfolio of Minister of Education and Vocational Training and Spokesperson of the Government On 7 June she took office as Minister and Spokeswoman before the King at Palace of Zarzuela.

Appointed as Spanish Ambassador to the Holy See, she presented her diplomatic credentials to Pontiff Francis on 18 March 2022.

Notes

References

Bibliography 
 

1949 births
20th-century Spanish politicians
20th-century Spanish women politicians
21st-century Spanish women politicians
Education ministers
Government ministers of Spain
Living people
Members of the 13th Congress of Deputies (Spain)
Politicians from Bilbao
Socialist Party of the Basque Country–Basque Country Left politicians
Spanish Socialist Workers' Party politicians
University of Deusto alumni
University of Valladolid alumni
Women government ministers of Spain
Women members of the Congress of Deputies (Spain)
Members of the 14th Congress of Deputies (Spain)
Basque women in politics
Ambassadors of Spain to the Holy See